The 2022 Kansas State Wildcats football team represented Kansas State University in the 2022 NCAA Division I FBS football season. The Wildcats played their home games at Bill Snyder Family Football Stadium in Manhattan, Kansas, and competed in the Big 12 Conference. They were led by fourth-year head coach Chris Klieman.

The Wildcats improved on their 8–5 performance the previous year by virtue of defeating in-state rival Kansas 47–27 on November 26. The following week, the Wildcats defeated 3rd-ranked TCU in the 2022 Big 12 Championship Game, securing their first conference title since 2012 and seventh overall.

Preseason

Award watch lists
Listed in the order that they were released

Big 12 media poll
The preseason poll was released on July 7, 2022.

First place votes in 

Preseason Big-12 awards
2022 Preseason All-Big 12 teams

Source:

Schedule
Kansas State and the Big 12 announced the 2022 football schedule on December 1, 2021.

Game summaries

South Dakota

Sources: ESPN Box Score K-State Box Score 

Kansas State's season opener produced an official 50,469 fans and its first sellout crowd since 2019.  Kansas State did hold back a number of players on injured reserve, including linebackers Will Honas and Shawn Robinson, as well as safeties Josh Hayes and TJ Smith.  Highlights included the Wildcats blocking a punt and running it in for a touchdown, what was called an "impressive" ground game, and Malik Knowles scored the earliest touchdown in school history just ten seconds into the game.  Kansas State won the game 34-0.  Coach Chris Klieman said about the shutout, “It’s really rare in college football so we are all really excited about it.”

Missouri

Sources: ESPN Box Score Team Stats K-State Box Score 

Kansas State and Mizzou have a history of 97 previous football games, but when Mizzou left the Big 12 conference to join the SEC, they ceased playing each other.  Kansas State won that last meeting in 2011 with a final score of 24-17 in Manhattan, but Missouri leads the overall series 60-32-5.

Game Time arrived but a weather delay at the beginning and one hour-long delay later in the middle of the game slowed the action. The game started with light rain which grew to more storms.  Through the weather, Missouri scored first with a field goal in the first quarter, but following a Kansas State touchdown on the next series, the Wildcats led the rest of the game.

Kansas State highlights included a 76-yard punt return for a touchdown by Phillip Brooks, just two plays after play resumed from the second weather delay. Credit was also given to Kansas State's defense and their ability to overwhelm the Missouri offensive line leading to pressure on Missouri's passing offense.

The Missouri Defense held Kansas State to 89 yards rushing and 14 points in the first half. Missouri did finally score a touchdown on the last play of the game, but it was far from enough. Kansas State won 40-12 for the first meeting of the program since 2011.

Tulane

Sources: K-State Box Score

Kansas State was a heavy favorite coming into the game and was stunned at home in losing to Tulane, 17-10.  The offense gained just 336 yards while going 2 of 15 on third downs and 1 of 5 on fourth downs.

No. 6 Oklahoma

Sources: K-State Box Score

Coming into the game as two-touchdown underdogs, K-State looked to rebound in a big way from a frustrating loss the week before against Tulane. The Wildcats jumped out to an excellent start, taking a 14-0 lead less than ten minutes into the contest on an Adrian Martinez touchdown run, followed by a TD pass to Malik Knowles.

Oklahoma, though, rallied with consecutive quick-strike touchdown drives (both scoring plays were over 50 yards) to tie the game at 14 each early in the second quarter. K-State, however, received a 58-yard kick return from Knowles to set up a short field, which Martinez converted into his second touchdown run, putting K-State back up 21-14. The Wildcats led the rest of the game from that point.

After both teams traded field goals to go into halftime with K-State ahead 24-17, the two squads again traded field goals as the only scores of the third quarter. In the fourth, K-State finally found the end zone again as Martinez scampered in from 15 yards out to put K-State ahead 34-20 with eight minutes to play. Oklahoma answered with a TD march to cut the deficit back to a touchdown, but K-State had the decisive answer.

Facing 3rd-and-16, Martinez scrambled for 55 yards down to the Oklahoma 4 yard line. Two plays later, he scored from a yard out for his fourth rushing touchdown of the night with 1:58 left to put K-State ahead 41-27. Oklahoma drove downfield and scored with 35 seconds left, but K-State recovered an onside kick to secure the win.

Martinez finished the night with 148 yards on the ground, the most by a K-State QB since 2016. Deuce Vaughn added 115 yards on the ground as well as K-State had two 100-yard rushers for the first time since the 2017 Cactus Bowl. K-State also defeated Oklahoma for the third time in four seasons. Postgame, Martinez said, "It's without a doubt my favorite game of all time."

Texas Tech

Sources: K-State Box Score

Iowa State

Sources: K-State Box Score

No. 8 TCU

Sources: K-State Box Score

No. 9 Oklahoma State

Sources: K-State Box Score

No. 24 Texas

Sources: K-State Box Score Stats

Baylor

Sources: K-State Box Score

West Virginia

Sources: K-State Box Score

Kansas

Sources: K-State Box Score

No. 3 TCU

Sources: K-State Box Score

No. 5 Alabama

Sources: K-State Box Score

Rankings

References

Kansas State
Kansas State Wildcats football seasons
Big 12 Conference football champion seasons
Kansas State Wildcats football